

Before 1980

1929
The Desert Song

1962
At the Drop of a Hat

1976
Pacific Overtures (original Broadway cast)

1978
The Comedy of Errors (ITV)

1980s

1980
The Pirates of Penzance (The Public Theater)
Tell Me on a Sunday (BBC)

1981
Ain't Misbehavin' (broadcast 1982)
Pippin (CTV)

1982
Camelot (2nd Broadway revival)
Sophisticated Ladies
Sweeney Todd: The Demon Barber of Fleet Street (Great Performances / National Tour production)

1985
The Gospel at Colonus
Sunday in the Park with George (Booth Theatre, Broadway; PBS American Playhouse broadcast 1986)

1986
Barnum (West End with Michael Crawford)
Candide (New York City Opera)

1989
 Show Boat (Great Performances)

1990s

1990

A Little Night Music (PBS Live from Lincoln Center)

1991
Candide (Barbician Concert)
Into the Woods (original Broadway cast / PBS American Playhouse)
The Will Rogers Follies

1993
Gypsy (with Bette Midler)
Nunsense (with Rue McClanahan)

1994
The Pirates of Penzance (Essgee Entertainment)
Jesus Christ Superstar: A Resurrection

1995
Les Misérables: The Dream Cast in Concert
Victor/Victoria
Company (Donmar Warehouse, London / BBC Two broadcast 1997)
Passion (PBS American Playhouse broadcast 1996, Image Entertainment release 2003)
The Wizard of Oz in Concert: Dreams Come True

1997

H.M.S. Pinafore (Essgee Entertainment)
Hello, Dolly! (North American tour with Carol Channing)

1998
Cats (PolyGram)

1999
Joseph and the Amazing Technicolor Dreamcoat (PolyGram / PBS Great Performances; broadcast 2000)

2000s

2000
 Jekyll & Hyde: Direct from Broadway (original Broadway run, final cast; Broadway Worldwide; broadcast 2001)
 Nunsense 2: The Sequel
 Peter Pan (A&E)
 Putting It Together: Direct from Broadway (Broadway Worldwide)
 Smokey Joe's Cafe: Direct from Broadway (Broadway Worldwide)

2001
 Sweeney Todd: The Demon Barber of Fleet Street: Live in Concert (Avery Fisher Hall, New York City)
 Nuncrackers: The Nunsense Christmas Musical

2002
 Fosse (PBS Great Performances)
 Ragtime (BBC Four)
 Contact (PBS Live from Lincoln Center)

2003
 Kiss Me, Kate (London revival / Great Performances)
 Nunsense 3: Sister Amnesia's Country Western Nunsense Jamboree
 Taboo

2004
 Our House

2005
 Acorn Antiques The Musical! (original West End cast, released 2006)
The Rat Pack: Live from Las Vegas
Candide (Lincoln Center)
Jerry Springer the Opera (BBC Two)
Passion

2006
 The Ten Commandments: The Musical (Kodak Theatre, Hollywood)
 South Pacific in Concert (Carnegie Hall)
 Jeff Wayne's Musical Version of the War of the Worlds
 The Light in the Piazza
 Company (Broadway revival with Raúl Esparza, Great Performances broadcast 2008)
 Manchester Passion (UK)
 Kiss Me Kate (West End)

2007
 Never Forget (original tour, Manchester Opera House)
 Naked Boys Singing!
 Nunsensations - The Nunsense Vegas Revue
 Legally Blonde (MTV)

2008

 Rocky Horror Tribute Show
 Keating! (ABC2)
 Rent: Filmed Live on Broadway (original Broadway run, final cast)
 Camelot (Lincoln Center)

2009

 Chess in Concert
 Passing Strange (Spike Lee / IFC)
 A Very Potter Musical (StarKid Productions)

2010s

2010
 Meshuggah-Nuns!
 Into the Woods (Regent's Park Open Air Theatre, London)
 Imagine This
 South Pacific (PBS Live From Lincoln Center)
 Les Misérables in Concert: The 25th Anniversary
 A Very Potter Sequel (StarKid Productions)

2011

 Company (New York Philharmonic revival with Neil Patrick Harris, DVD and Blu-Ray release 2012)
 Memphis: Direct from Broadway
 Phantom of the Opera at the Royal Albert Hall
 Starship (StarKid Productions)

2012
 Nunset Boulevard
 Love Never Dies (Regent Theatre, Melbourne)
 Jesus Christ Superstar (Arena Tour)
 Holy Musical B@man! (StarKid Productions)
 A Very Potter Senior Year (StarKid Productions)

2013

 Shrek the Musical
 Jeff Wayne's Musical Version of The War of the Worlds – The New Generation
 Follies
 Carousel
 Merrily We Roll Along (West End)
 Sunday in the Park With George (Mezzo TV)
 The Sound of Music Live! (NBC)
 Twisted (StarKid Productions)

2014

 Billy Elliot the Musical Live
 21 Chump Street
 From Here to Eternity
 Sweeney Todd: The Demon Barber of Fleet Street in Concert (Live from Lincoln Center)
 Kiss Me, Kate
 Lady Day at Emerson's Bar and Grill (HBO broadcast 2016)
 Miss Saigon: 25th Anniversary
 The Trail to Oregon! (StarKid Productions)
 Ani (StarKid Productions)
 Peter Pan Live!

2015

 Bad Girls: The Musical
 Daddy Long Legs
 Allegiance (Broadway)
 Gypsy: Live from the Savoy Theatre
 The Rocky Horror Show Live (40th Anniversary broadcast, West End)
 The Sound of Music Live (UK)
 The Wiz Live! (NBC)

2016
 She Loves Me (BroadwayHD)
 The Threepenny Opera
 Bandstand
 Holiday Inn (BroadwayHD release 2017)
 Falsettos (PBS Great Performances broadcast 2017)
 Grease Live! 
 The Passion: New Orleans (Fox television event)
 Spies Are Forever (Tin Can Brothers)
 Allegiance (Broadway)
 Firebringer (StarKid Productions)
 The Woodsman
 Hairspray Live! (NBC television event)

2017
 A Christmas Story Live!
 An American in Paris (West End / PBS Great Performances; broadcast 2018)
 Anna Karenina
 Elf (Channel 5, UK)
 Follies (West End revival)
 Funny Girl (West End revival)
 Lazarus (original New York broadcast 2018, global broadcast 2021)
 The MeshugaNutcracker!
 Newsies
 The Wind in the Willows (BroadwayHD)

2018
 The Toxic Avenger (BroadwayHD)
 Jesus Christ Superstar Live in Concert
 The King and I (West End revival)
 Everybody's Talking About Jamie
 The Guy Who Didn't Like Musicals (StarKid Productions)

2019
 Aladdin (Disney+ exclusive release 2023)
 Les Misérables: The Staged Concert
 Kinky Boots
 Black Friday (StarKid Productions)
 42nd Street
 Into the Woods: Live at the Hollywood Bowl
 Rent: Live (Fox television event)
 Ruthless!
 The Little Mermaid Live!
 The SpongeBob Musical: Live On Stage! (Nickelodeon)
 Fame (Peacock Theatre, London; BroadwayHD release 2020)

2020s

2020
 Curtains (Palace Theatre, Manchester)
 Dr. Seuss' The Grinch Musical Live! (NBC)
 Eugenius!
 Godspell: 50th Anniversary Concert (BroadwayHD)
 Hamilton (Walt Disney Studios Motion Pictures)
 Spring Awakening (Argentina)

2021
 Anything Goes (BBC 2)
 Annie Live! (NBC television event)
 Come From Away (Entertainment One / RadicalMedia)
 Diana (Netflix)
 Rak of Aegis
 The Prince of Egypt (Universal Pictures)
 Waitress

2022
 Beauty and the Beast: A 30th Celebration
 Bonnie & Clyde
 Emojiland
 Girl from the North Country (Broadway)
 Heathers: The Musical (West End revival / Roku Original)
 Six (original West End cast reunion)

2023
 Jersey Boys (pending)

See also
List of musical films by year

References

Musical films by year
Films

Filmed live on stage